Prime Minister of China (formally named "Premier of China") may refer to:

Premier of the People's Republic of China (PRC)
Premier of the Republic of China (ROC)
Prime Minister of the Imperial Cabinet (Qing dynasty)
Chancellor of China (ancient China)

fr:Premier ministre de Chine